Karimabad (also Romanized as Karīmābād; also known as Karim Abad Hoomeh Zarand) is a village in Mohammadabad Rural District, in the Central District of Zarand County, Kerman Province, Iran. At the 2006 census, its population was 340, in 87 families.

References 

Populated places in Zarand County